Aphanochaetaceae is a family of algae in the order Chaetophorales.

Genera 
Aphanochaete Braun
Chaetonema Nowakowski [Nowakovsky]
Gonatoblaste J.Huber, 1892
Micropoa Moewus 
Thamniochaete F.Gay

References

External links

Chlorophyceae families
Chaetophorales